2nd Grenadier Guards F.C. were an English football team that played in the London League Division One during the 1897–98 season, finishing ninth of nine. In that season champions Thames Ironworks F.C. recorded their equal biggest win of the season against the 2nd Grenadier Guards, beating them 5–1.

They joined the Southern Football League in 1908 and finished fourth of seven in Division Two. They withdrew from the league after this season.

See also
Grenadier Guards
3rd Grenadier Guards F.C.

References
Football Club History Database

Second Grenadier Guards
Association football clubs disestablished in 1909
Defunct football clubs in London
2nd Gren
Southern Football League clubs
1909 disestablishments in England
Association football clubs established in the 19th century
Military football clubs in England
Great Western Suburban League
London League (football)